The 1962 World Ninepin Bowling Classic Championships was the fifth edition of the championships and was held in Bratislava, Czechoslovakia, from 24 to 29 September 1962.

In the men's competition the title was won by Czechoslovakia in the team competition and by József Szabó (Hungary) in the individual event. In the women's competition the title was won by Jugoslawien in the team competition and by Vlasta  Šindlerová (Czechoslovakia) in the individual event.

Participating teams

Men

Women

Results

Men - team 
The competition was played with 200 throws mixed (100 full, 100 clean). Teams were composed of 6 competitors and the scores were added up.

|}

Women - team 
The competition was played with 100 throws mixed (50 full, 50 clean). Teams were composed of 6 competitors and the scores were added up.

|}

Men - individual 

|}

Women - individual 

|}

Medal summary

Medal table

Men

Women

References 
 WC Archive on KZS
 WC History on WNBA NBC

World Ninepin Bowling Classic Championships
1962 in bowling
1962 in Czechoslovak sport
International sports competitions hosted by Czechoslovakia
Sports competitions in Bratislava